Blood of My Blood is a 2011 Portuguese drama film directed by João Canijo. The film premiered at the Toronto International Film Festival and was awarded at the San Sebastian International Film Festival, the Palm Springs International Film Festival, and the Miami International Film Festival, among others. It was the most commercially successful film of the year in Portugal.

The film was selected as the Portuguese entry for the Best Foreign Language Oscar at the 85th Academy Awards.

Cast 
Rafael Morais as Joca Fialho
Rita Blanco as Márcia Fialho
Cleia Almeida as Cláudia Filipa Fialho
Anabela Moreira as Ivete Fialho
Marcello Urgeghe as Dr. Alberto Vieira
Francisco Tavares as César Chaves
Fernando Luís as Hélder
Nuno Lopes as Telmo Sobral
Beatriz Batarda as Maria da Luz

Production
The final scene of Anabela Moreira and Nuno Lopes was particularly demanding for the actors given the physical, emotional and sexual violence. For the actress, it wasn't the nudity that bothered her, "but the scene was so vivid that Nuno Lopes hugged me, at the end, and apologized."

Film Festivals Around the World 

Toronto International Film Festival... Canada
Miami International Film Festival... USA
Palm Springs International Film Festival... USA
AFI Fest... USA
Chicago International Film Festival... USA
Austin Film Festival... USA
Seattle International Film Festival... USA
San Sebastian International Film Festival... Spain
Busan Film Festival... South Korea
Edinburgh Film Festival... UK
Rio de Janeiro International Film Festival... Brazil
Torino Film Festival... Italy
Buenos Aires International Festival of Independent Cinema... Argentine
La Rochelle... France
Leeds Film Festival... UK
Hamburg Film Festival... Germany
Pau Film Festival... France
Linz Film Festival... Austria
Barcelona Film Festival... Spain
Istanbul International Film Festival... Turkey
Panama International Film Festival... Panama
Transilvania International Film Festival... Romania
Oaxaca Film Fest... Mexico
Skopje Film Festival... Macedonia
Berlin Film Festival... Germany

See also
 List of submissions to the 85th Academy Awards for Best Foreign Language Film
 List of Portuguese submissions for the Academy Award for Best Foreign Language Film

References

External links 
 

Films directed by João Canijo
2011 drama films
2011 films
Portuguese drama films
Films shot in Lisbon
Films set in Lisbon
Golden Globes (Portugal) winners
Films shot in Portugal
2010s Portuguese-language films